Different Drum is the first compilation album by Linda Ronstadt to be released by Capitol. Half of the tracks (those shown as having been recorded in 1967 and 1968) are taken from the second and third albums by The Stone Poneys; while the other half are from her first three solo albums.

This album was issued 10 months prior to the November 1974 release of Ronstadt's final album for Capitol, Heart Like a Wheel – which became her breakthrough #1 album – but after she had already signed with Asylum. The album reached #92 on the Billboard Top LPs & Tape chart.

Release data
The album was originally released as a stereophonic LP by Capitol in 1974 (catalogue number ST-11269). In 1995, the album was reissued on CD (catalogue number 80131).

Track listing

References

Linda Ronstadt compilation albums
Stone Poneys albums
1974 compilation albums
Capitol Records compilation albums